Morioka Takaya Arena is an arena in Morioka, Iwate, Japan. It is the home arena of the Iwate Big Bulls of the B.League, Japan's professional basketball league.

References

Basketball venues in Japan
1989 establishments in Japan
Sport in Morioka
Indoor arenas in Japan
Iwate Big Bulls
Sports venues in Iwate Prefecture
Sports venues completed in 1989